Radioland Murders is a 1994 American comedy thriller film directed by Mel Smith and executive produced by George Lucas. Radioland Murders is set in the 1939 atmosphere of old-time radio and pays homage to the screwball comedy films of the 1930s. The film tells the story of writer Roger Henderson trying to settle relationship issues with his wife Penny while dealing with a whodunit murder mystery in a radio station. The film stars an ensemble cast, including Brian Benben, Mary Stuart Masterson, Scott Michael Campbell, Michael Lerner, and Ned Beatty. Radioland Murders also features numerous small roles and cameo appearances, including Michael McKean, Bobcat Goldthwait, Jeffrey Tambor, Christopher Lloyd, George Burns (in his final film appearance), Billy Barty, and Rosemary Clooney.

George Lucas began development for the film in the 1970s, originally attached as director for Willard Huyck and Gloria Katz's script, from a story by Lucas. Universal Pictures commenced pre-production and both Steve Martin and Cindy Williams had already been approached for the two leads before Radioland Murders languished in development hell for over 20 years. In 1993, Lucas told Universal that advances in computer-generated imagery from Industrial Light & Magic (owned by Lucasfilm), particularly in digital mattes, would help bring Radioland Murders in for a relatively low budget of about $10 million, which eventually rose to $15 million. Mel Smith was hired to direct and filming lasted from October to December 1993. Radioland Murders was released on October 21, 1994, to negative reviews from critics and bombed at the box office, only grossing $1.37 million in the U.S.

Plot

In 1939, a new radio network based at station WBN in Chicago, Illinois, begins its inaugural night. The station's owner, General Walt Whalen, depends on his employees to impress main sponsor Bernie King. This includes writer Roger Henderson, assistant director Penny Henderson (Roger's wife, seeking divorce), page boy Billy Budget, engineer Max Applewhite, conductor Rick Rochester, announcer Dexter Morris, director Walt Whalen, Jr. and stage manager Herman Katzenback. After King commissions rewrites on the radio scripts, the WBN writers get angry, complaining that they have not been paid in weeks.

When trumpet player Ruffles Reedy falls dead from rat poisoning, a series of events ensue. Director Walt Jr. is hanged (the mysterious killer makes it look like a suicide), and his father, the General, has the Chicago Police Department (CPD) get involved to solve the murder mysteries as the nightly radio performance continues. Katzenback is then killed after attempting to fix the main stage when the machinery malfunctions. Penny is appointed both stage manager and director due to Walt Jr. and Katzenback's deaths. Roger tries to solve the killings, greatly annoying the police, led by Lieutenant Cross.

Because Roger unfortunately appears at every crime scene just as the murders take place, he is ruled as the prime suspect. Roger and Billy Budget then theorize that announcer Dexter Morris is the next to die. Dexter ignores their warning and is fatally electrocuted. By going through private documents in WBN's file room, Roger finds that the victims all previously worked together at a radio station in Peoria, Illinois, which he then correlates into a secretive FCC scandal. King (laughing gas) and General Whalen (falls down an elevator shaft) are the next to die after Roger's warning, making the police even more suspicious.

After escaping from custody, Roger uses Billy to communicate and send scripts to Penny. When rewriting one of the programs, Gork: Son of Fire, Roger attempts to write the script with self-referential events, proving to everyone that the mysterious killer is actually sound engineer Max Applewhite. Max explains that his killings were a revenge scheme that dealt with stockholders and patents, specifically detailing his invention of television, which other scientists have copied. Max takes Roger and Penny atop the radio tower at gunpoint, but is eventually killed when a biplane shows up and guns him down. Impressed by the nightly performance, the sponsors decide to fund WBN. Roger and Penny reconcile their complex relationship and decide not to divorce.

Cast
 Brian Benben as Roger Henderson, Ecstatic writer of WBN and husband to Penny. Much to the consternation of the police force, Roger solves the murder mystery.
Mary Stuart Masterson as Penny Henderson: Stressed WBN secretary who is promoted to both director and stage manager after the deaths of Walt Jr. and Herman Katzenback. She initially intends to divorce Roger after mistakenly believing he was having an affair with Claudette Katzenback, but they later reconcile their relationship.
 Scott Michael Campbell as Billy Budget, WBN page boy who is used by Roger to communicate with Penny and send scripts, despite the fact that he is trying to hide from the police.
 Michael Lerner as Lieutenant Cross, Short-tempered policeman who has a vendetta against Roger.
Ned Beatty as General Walt Whalen: Owner of WBN who commands his staff with a military-like work environment. The General dies after falling down an elevator shaft.
 Brion James as Bernie King, WBN's main sponsor who has no sense of humor. King eventually dies from laughing gas.
 Stephen Tobolowsky as Max Applewhite, WBN's sound engineer who is found to be responsible for the murders. Max dies after getting shot atop the radio tower.
 Michael McKean as Rick Rochester, WBN band conductor who despises Dexter (McKean also appeared as Benben's boss in Dream On).
 Corbin Bernsen as Dexter Morris, The station's announcer who has a smoking habit. Dexter dies of electrocution, ignoring Roger and Billy's warning.
 Bobcat Goldthwait as Wild Writer, Violent and melancholic WBN writer.
 Anita Morris as Claudette Katzenback, Famous singer and Herman's wife. Penny catches her with Roger, presumably having sex, but this appears to have been a prank Claudette created. Roger originally believes she was responsible for killings. This was Anita Morris' final acting role, as she died seven months before the film's release.
 Jeffrey Tambor as Walt Whalen Jr., The General's toupée-wearing son and show director.
Larry Miller as Herman Katzenback: German stage manager of WBN. Herman is the third to die and is aware of Claudette's multiple affairs with other employees.
 Christopher Lloyd as Zoltan, Eccentric sound designer.
Harvey Korman as Jules Cogley: Alcoholic writer who confirms that Ruffles' death came from poisoning.
 Dylan Baker as Detective Jasper, Cross' idiot assistant.
 Jack Sheldon as "Ruffles" Reedy, Drunk trumpet player of Rochester's band. He is the first to die.

Cameo appearances are provided by George Burns (in his final feature film, as Milt Lackey, a 100-year-old comedian), Joey Lawrence, Billy Barty, Peter MacNicol, Robert Klein, Ellen Albertini Dow, Candy Clark, Bo Hopkins (as Billy Budget's parents) and Wilbur Fitzgerald, as well as singers Rosemary Clooney and Tracy Byrd.

Production

Development
The genesis of Radioland Murders came from executive producer/co-writer George Lucas's obsession with old-time radio. Lucas conceived the storyline of the film during the writing phase of American Graffiti, viewing it as a homage to the various Abbott and Costello films, primarily Who Done It (1942), in which Abbott and Costello star as two soda jerks solving a murder in a radio station. Radioland Murders also shares some inspiration from The Big Clock (1948). When Universal Pictures accepted American Graffiti in 1972, Lucas also allowed the studio first-look deals for both Radioland Murders and an untitled science fiction film (which eventually became the basis for Star Wars).

Lucas eventually negotiated a deal to produce Radioland Murders for Universal shortly after the successful release of American Graffiti in late 1973. Willard Huyck and Gloria Katz prepared a rough draft based on Lucas's 1974 film treatment, and Universal was confident enough to announce pre-production soon after. Lucas was set to direct with Gary Kurtz producing. In the original Huyck/Katz script, Roger and Penny were not a married couple seeking divorce, but were boyfriend and girlfriend with a love-hate relationship. Their script also included the controversy over the invention of radio.

In July 1978, Lucas revealed that Radioland Murders was still in development, and that both Steve Martin and Cindy Williams were approached for the two leads. The script was being rewritten and the planned start date was early 1979. However, throughout the 1970s to early 1990s, Radioland Murders remained in development hell. Between this time, Lucas commissioned Theodore J. Flicker to perform a rewrite. In early 1993 Lucas told Universal that advances in computer-generated imagery from Industrial Light & Magic (owned by Lucasfilm), particularly in digital mattes, would help bring Radioland Murders in for a relatively low budget of about $10 million, which eventually rose to $15 million.

Pre-production
Universal agreed to greenlight Radioland Murders if Lucas would "update" the script. The Huyck/Katz script contained parodies of old-time radio that the general public in the 1970s would likely acknowledge. Universal reasoned that the script would have to be modified in an attempt to accustom audiences from the MTV Generation. Based on Ron Howard's recommendation, Lucas hired Jeff Reno and Ron Osborn (known for their work on Moonlighting) to "update" the screenplay. The shooting script was prepared by Lucas, who combined his favorite elements of the Reno/Osborn draft with the original Huyck/Katz script from the 1970s. Lucas then hired Mel Smith to direct, who recommended Brian Benben for the lead role. Lucas specifically chose Smith because he believed the British comedian/filmmaker could handle Radioland Murders form of slapstick comedy and dark humor. Universal was adamant that the ensemble cast be filled with then-popular TV stars of the early 1990s. Christopher Lloyd agreed to make a small appearance as the eccentric sound designer Zoltan on the agreement that all of his scenes were shot in one day.

Filming
Principal photography for Radioland Murders began on October 28, 1993 at Carolco Studios in Wilmington, North Carolina. Brief filming also took place at Hollywood Center Studios. Production designer Gavin Bocquet (Star Wars prequels, Stardust) disguised the film's limited rooms in a beehivelike structure. Larger areas, notably the exterior of the building and the transmission tower on the roof, were created or augmented with digital mattes added by visual effects supervisor Scott Squires (The Lost World: Jurassic Park, Star Wars: Episode I – The Phantom Menace) at Industrial Light & Magic. Following a break, in which Lucas, director Mel Smith and editor Paul Trejo reviewed the footage using the new digital Avid Technology editing system (the successor to EditDroid), the cast and crew were reassembled for a further two weeks of filming. Principal photography for Radioland Murders ended on December 23, 1993.

Release
To market Radioland Murders, Universal attached a film trailer to The Flintstones in May 1994. The studio believed both films would specifically appeal to the Baby Boom Generation. Radioland Murders was originally set to be theatrically released in September 1994 before it was pushed back. The film was released in the United States on October 21, 1994 in 844 theaters, only grossing $1.37 million. Ultimately the film bombed at the box office because it did not recoup its $15 million budget. It ranks among the top ten widely released films for having the biggest second weekend drop at the box office, dropping 78.5% from $835,570 to $179,315.

Critical reception
Radioland Murders received negative reviews with Rotten Tomatoes calculating  approval rating based on  reviews collected. Roger Ebert criticized the film for containing too much slapstick comedy instead of subtle humor. Although he praised the art direction and visual effects, Ebert believed "the movie just doesn't work. It's all action and no character, all situation and no comedy. The slapstick starts so soon and lasts so long that we don't have an opportunity to meet or care about the characters in a way that would make their actions funny." Richard Schickel, writing in Time magazine gave a mixed review, mainly criticizing the film for its fast pacing. Caryn James of The New York Times dismissed the film for trying too hard to pay homage to screwball comedy films of the 1930s.

Mick LaSalle of the San Francisco Chronicle gave a mixed reaction, feeling the filmmakers failed in attempting to woo audiences with nostalgia. Internet reviewer James Berardinelli called the film a "horrible concoction synthesizing elements of The Hudsucker Proxy and Brain Donors, and setting them in the world of David Lynch's On the Air. This film has more gags in it than anything this side of a Zucker, Abrahams and Zucker production, too few of which work."

Year-end lists
 1st worst – Michael Mills, The Palm Beach Post
 1st worst – Stephen Hunter, The Baltimore Sun
 4th worst – Desson Howe, The Washington Post
 Top 10 worst (listed alphabetically, not ranked) – William Arnold, Seattle Post-Intelligencer
 Top 10 worst (listed alphabetically, not ranked) – Mike Mayo, The Roanoke Times

Home media
The first Region 1 DVD release came in March 1998 by Image Entertainment. Universal Studios Home Entertainment re-released the film on DVD in August 2006. Universal Studios Home Entertainment released the film on Blu-ray on August 13, 2019 ahead of its 25th anniversary.

See also
Danger on the Air, a 1938 mystery-comedy film set in a radio station
Up in the Air, a 1940 mystery-comedy film set in a radio station
 Who Done It?, a 1942 mystery-comedy film set in a radio station

References

External links
  at 
 
 
 
 

1994 films
1990s comedy mystery films
American comedy thriller films
Films scored by Joel McNeely
Films about radio people
Films directed by Mel Smith
Films with screenplays by George Lucas
Films produced by Rick McCallum
Films set in 1939
Films set in Chicago
Films shot in Los Angeles
Films shot in North Carolina
Lucasfilm films
Films with screenplays by Willard Huyck
Films with screenplays by Gloria Katz
Universal Pictures films
1994 comedy films
1990s English-language films
1990s American films